Rodolfo Graziani, 1st Marquis of Neghelli (11 August 1882 – 11 January 1955), was a prominent Italian military officer in the Kingdom of Italy's Regio Esercito ("Royal Army"), primarily noted for his campaigns in Africa before and during World War II. A dedicated fascist and prominent member of the National Fascist Party, he was a key figure in the Italian military during the reign of Victor Emmanuel III.

Graziani played an important role in the consolidation and expansion of the Italian colonial empire during the 1920s and 1930s, first in Libya and then in Ethiopia. He became infamous for harsh repressive measures, such as the use of concentration camps that caused many civilian deaths, and for extreme measures taken against the native resistance of the countries invaded by the Italian army, such as the hanging of Omar Mukhtar. Due to his brutal methods used in Libya, he was nicknamed Il macellaio del Fezzan ("the butcher of Fezzan"). In February 1937, after an assassination attempt against him during a ceremony in Addis Ababa, Graziani ordered a period of brutal retribution now known as Yekatit 12. Shortly after the Kingdom of Italy entered World War II, he returned to Libya as the commander of troops in Italian North Africa but resigned after the 1940–41 British offensive routed his forces; this campaign caused him other stress attacks, which he suffered from a snake accident during his military service in Libya that happened a few years before World War I.

Following the fall of the Fascist regime in Italy in 1943, he was the only Marshal of Italy who remained loyal to Benito Mussolini and was named the Minister of Defence of the Italian Social Republic, commanding its army and returning to active service against the Allies for the rest of the war. Graziani was never prosecuted by the United Nations War Crimes Commission; he was included on its list of Italians eligible to be prosecuted for war crimes but Allied opposition and indifference to the prosecution of Italian war criminals frustrated Ethiopian attempts to bring him to justice. In 1948, an Italian court sentenced Graziani to 19 years of imprisonment for his collaboration with the Nazis; he was released after serving only four months. In the last years of his life, he went into politics, entering in Italian Social Movement and becoming also Honorary President in 1953, probably for his career during the Fascist period in Italy, and died a few years later in 1955.

Early life
Rodolfo Graziani was born in Filettino in the province of Frosinone on August 11, 1882. His father, Filippo Graziani, was the village doctor. He was educated in a seminary in the town of Subiaco and then went on to study in the Liceo Torquato Tasso in Rome. Due to economic restraints, Graziani could not apply to the Military Academy of Modena and so decided to study law at university instead, at the urging of the father.

Military career
In 1900, he joined the Royal Italian Army as a reserve officer cadet whilst studying at university. In 1906, he passed a competitive examination for reserve officers to be made regular and became a second lieutenant, stationed at the 1st regiment of Grenadiers in Rome.
Graziani's first posting was to Italian Eritrea where he learned Arabic and Tigrinya. In 1911, whilst in the Eritrean countryside, he was bitten by a snake which resulted in him being hospitalized. Because of this, he never served in the Italo-Turkish War. After his convalescence, he was repatriated to Italy where he was promoted to captain. In 1918, during World War I, Graziani in the Regio Esercito became the youngest Colonnello (Colonel) in Italian history.

Libya
In 1930, the Fascist government appointed Graziani Vice-Governor of Cyrenaica and commander of the Italian forces in Libya. He served there until 1934. During those four years, he suppressed the Senussi rebellion. In this so-called "pacification", he was responsible for the construction of several concentration camps and labor camps, where thousands of Libyan prisoners died. Some prisoners were hanged, such as Omar Mukhtar, or shot, but most prisoners died of starvation or disease. His deeds earned him the nickname "the Butcher of Fezzan" among the Arabs. But Italians called him the Pacifier of Libya (Pacificatore della Libia).

In 1935, Graziani was appointed Governor of Italian Somaliland.

Ethiopia

During the Second Italo-Ethiopian War in 1935 and 1936, Graziani was the commander of the southern front. His army invaded Ethiopia from Italian Somaliland and he commanded the Italian forces at the battles of Genale Doria and the Ogaden. However, Graziani's efforts in the south were secondary to the main invasion launched from Eritrea by Generale Emilio De Bono, later continued by Marshal of Italy Pietro Badoglio. It was Badoglio and not Graziani who entered Addis Ababa in triumph after his "March of the Iron Will". But it was Graziani who said: "The Duce will have Ethiopia, with or without the Ethiopians."

Addis Ababa fell to Badoglio on 5 May 1936. Graziani had wanted to reach Harar before Badoglio reached Addis Ababa, but failed to do so. Even so, on 9 May, Graziani was rewarded for his role as commander of the southern front with a promotion to the rank of Marshal of Italy. During his tour of an Ethiopian Orthodox church in Dire Dawa, Graziani fell into a pit covered by an ornate carpet, a trap that he believed had been set by the Ethiopian priests to injure or kill him. As a result, he held Ethiopian clerics in deep suspicion.

After the war, Graziani was made Viceroy of Italian East Africa and Governor-General of Shewa / Addis Ababa. After an unsuccessful attempt by two Eritreans to kill him on 19 February 1937 (and after murders of other Italians in occupied Ethiopia), Graziani ordered a bloody and indiscriminate reprisal upon the conquered country, later remembered by Ethiopians as Yekatit 12. Up to thirty thousand civilians of Addis Ababa were killed indiscriminately; another 1,469 were summarily executed by the end of the next month, and over one thousand Ethiopian notables were imprisoned and then exiled from Ethiopia. Graziani became known as "the Butcher of Ethiopia". In connection with the attempt on his life, Graziani authorized the massacre of the monks of the ancient monastery of Debre Libanos and a large number of pilgrims, who had traveled there to celebrate the feast day of the founding saint of the monastery. Graziani's suspicion of the Ethiopian Orthodox clergy (and the fact that the wife of one of the assassins had briefly taken sanctuary at the monastery) had convinced him of the monks' complicity in the attempt on his life.

From 1939 to 1941, Graziani was Chief of Staff of the Regio Esercito.

World War II

At the start of World War II, Graziani, now styled 1st Marquis of Neghelli, was still Commander-in-Chief of the Regio Esercito′s General Staff. After the death of Marshal Italo Balbo in a friendly fire incident on 28 June 1940, Graziani took his place as Governor General and Commander-in-Chief of Italian North Africa.

The Italian dictator Benito Mussolini had given Graziani a deadline of 8 August 1940 to invade Egypt with the 10th Army. Graziani doubted the ability of his largely un-mechanized force to defeat the British and put off the invasion for as long as he could.

However, faced with demotion, Graziani ultimately followed orders, and  four divisions of the 10th Army invaded Egypt on 9 September. The Italians achieved only modest gains in Egypt and then prepared a series of fortified camps to defend their positions. In December 1940, the British counterattacked and completely defeated the 10th Army. On 25 March 1941, Graziani was replaced by General Italo Gariboldi. Graziani remained mostly inactive for the next two years. During his time in Italy, he played a role in suppressing the Italian anti-fascist movement.

Graziani was the only Italian Marshal to remain loyal to Mussolini after the fall of the Fascist regime in Italy, and joined Mussolini in the north after the Italian surrender (someone say that he choose to adhere to Italian Social Republic for his dislike for Pietro Badoglio, who had signed the Armistice of Cassibile with the allies and because he was his worst enemy during the fascist period). He was appointed Minister of Defense of the Italian Social Republic by Mussolini and oversaw the mixed Italo-German Army Group Liguria (Armee Ligurien). Graziani defeated Allied forces in the December 1944 "Battle of Garfagnana", leading a mixed Italian / German force that included the "Monte Rosa" alpine division and the "San Marco" marine division.

When Mussolini fled northward on 25 April 1945, Graziani was left as the de facto leader of what remained of the RSI. Mussolini was captured and executed on 28 April 1945. The following day, German forces in Italy surrendered, and Graziani's own surrender followed on 1 May 1945.

At the end of World War II, Graziani spent a few days in the San Vittore Prison in Milan before being transferred to Allied control. He was brought back to Africa in Anglo-American custody, staying there until February 1946. Allied forces then felt the danger of his assassination or lynching had passed (many thousands of fascists were murdered in Italy in the summer and autumn of 1945), and moved Graziani to the Procida prison in Italy.

War crimes and indictments

Before the Second World War, the League of Nations did not prosecute Graziani and the Italian authorities for war crimes in Ethiopia. In one case, Graziani had ordered his troops to use chemical weapons against Nasibu Zeamanuel's troops in Gorrahei on 10 October 1935. Although the Ethiopian Minister of Foreign Affairs gave the League of Nations irrefutable evidence of what the Italian military had done from within a few hours of its invasion on 3 October 1935 to 10 April of the following year, no action was taken. Incidents included the use of poison gas and the bombing of Red Cross hospitals and ambulances.

In 1943, the United States proposed to her Allies a replacement for the League of Nations with a new body, the United Nations. The United Nations War Crimes Commission was created to investigate allegations of war crimes committed by Axis powers in World War II. On 31 December 1946, Ambaye Wolde Mariam from The Ethiopian War Crimes Commission presented to the UN War Crimes Commission its preliminary findings against Graziani. This related, however, to the period before WWII. The Ethiopian government felt it would have no difficulty from the sufficient amount of evidence it had to justify a trial against Graziani, especially for the massacres he ordered in February 1937. On 4 March 1948, charges against Graziani were presented to the United Nations War Crimes Commission. The commission was presented with evidence of the Italian policy of systematic terrorism and Graziani's self-admitted intention to execute all Amharas authorities and cited a telegram from Graziani to General Nasi, in which Graziani had written, "Keep in mind also that I have already aimed at the total destruction of Abyssinian chiefs and notables and that this should be carried out completely in your territories". The UN Commission agreed that there was a prima facie case against eight Italians, including Graziani.

However, the Allies questioned the veracity of Ethiopia's claim against the Italians on the grounds that it was impossible to identify which individuals in the Italian military hierarchy had actually issued the criminal orders. The British government was the firmest supporter of that stance, and the United States pursued a policy "largely characterized by ambivalence towards Italian aggression". The Ethiopian government made a direct request to the "Four Policemen", but that was immediately rejected on technical grounds. In addition, many in the Italian press firmly opposed any Italian officer being put on trial for war crimes. Faced with such resistance and indifference, Ethiopia had no choice but to back down from their requests, to the consternation of many Ethiopians.

In 1948, an Italian military tribunal sentenced Graziani to 19 years in jail for collaborating with the Nazis, but he was released after only four months because his lawyers demonstrated that his actions had been only after he "received orders". He never faced any further prosecutions for any other specific war crimes. Unlike the Germans and the Japanese, the Italians did not have their commanders subjected to prosecutions by Allied tribunals.

In the early 1950s, Graziani had some involvement with the neo-fascist Italian Social Movement (MSI), and he became the "Honorary President" of the party in 1953.

Death
He died, aged 72, of natural causes in Rome.

Mausoleum controversy
In August 2012, $160,000 of public money was used to help finance the building of a large monument atop Graziani's tomb in Affile. The subscription was supplemented by private funding from the mayor of Affile, Ettore Viri. The new mausoleum was engraved with the words "Fatherland" and "Honor". Local left-wing politicians and national commentators harshly criticized the monument whereas the town's "mostly conservative" population approved. Public funding for the Graziani monument was suspended by the newly elected Lazio administration after the 2013 regional elections. A statement from Ethiopia's Ministry of Foreign Affairs said Graziani did not deserve to be memorialized but instead be condemned in history for his war crimes, genocidal behavior and crimes against humanity.

Books
Graziani wrote several books, the most important of which are:
 Ho difeso la Patria (una vita per l'Italia)
 Africa settentrionale 1940–41
 Libia redenta

also:
 Verso il Fezzan
 La riconquista del Fezzan
 Cirenaica pacificata
 Pace romana in Libia

Military career
 1915-1918—Service in World War I
 1921-1934—Service in Libya
 1926-1930—Vice Governor-General of Italian Cyrenaica
 1930-1934—Governor-General of Italian Cyrenaica
 1935-1936—Governor-General of Italian Somaliland
 1936-1937—Governor-General and Viceroy of Ethiopia; promoted to Marshal of Italy
 1940-1941—Commander-in-Chief of Italian North Africa and Governor-General of Libya
 1943-1945—Minister of Defense for the Italian Social Republic

In popular culture

Graziani was portrayed by British actor Oliver Reed in the 1981 war film Lion of the Desert. On its release, it was banned by the Italian government because, in the words of Prime Minister Giulio Andreotti, it was "damaging to the honor of the army".

Graziani was also portrayed by Rodolfo Dal Pra in the Italian film Last Days of Mussolini.

The Italian singer and composer Franco Battiato included a reference to Graziani in his song "Lettera al Governatore della Libia" (Letter to the governor of Libya) with the phrase "Lo sai che quell'idiota di Graziani farà una brutta fine" (You know that the idiotic Graziani will have a bad end).

Bibliography
 Canosa, Romano. Graziani. Il maresciallo d'Italia, dalla guerra d'Etiopia alla Repubblica di Salò. Editore Mondadori; Collana: Oscar storia. 
 Cova, Alessandro. Rodolfo Graziani: Story of an Italian general. Fonthill Media, 2021, .
 Del Boca, AngeloNaissance de la nation libyenne, Editions Milelli, 2008, .
 Pankhurst, Richard. History of the Ethiopian Patriots (1936-1940), The Graziani Massacre and Consequences. Addis Abeba Tribune editions.
 Rocco, Giuseppe. L'organizzazione militare della RSI, sul finire della seconda guerra mondiale. Greco & Greco Editori. Milano, 1998

Further reading
Italian War Criminal Rodolfo Graziani, Blaine Taylor, Warfare History Network, 21 February 2020

See also
 Frontier Wire (Libya)

Notes

External links

 

1882 births
1955 deaths
Field marshals of Italy
Genocide perpetrators
Governors of Italian Somaliland
Governors-General of Italian Libya
Italian anti-communists
Italian colonial governors and administrators
Italian East Africa
Italian generals
Italian military personnel of the Italo-Turkish War
Italian military personnel of World War I
Italian military personnel of World War II
Italian military personnel of the Second Italo-Ethiopian War
Italian people convicted of war crimes
Italian Social Movement politicians
Italian war crimes
National Fascist Party politicians
People of the Italian Social Republic
People convicted of treason
People from the Province of Frosinone
People of former Italian colonies
Yekatit 12
Italian mass murderers